The Democratic Unionist Party is a Northern Irish political party.

Democratic Unionist Party may also refer to:

 Arabic Democratic Unionist Party, a Syrian political party
 Democratic Unionist Party (Sudan), a Sudanese political party
 Socialist Democratic Unionist Party, a Mauritanian political party

See also
 Democratic Union Party (disambiguation)